Robert Pritchard may refer to:

 Robert W. Pritchard (born 1945), American politician in Illinois 
 Robert Pritchard (lawyer) (born 1941), Australian lawyer

See also
 Bob Pritchard (composer) (born 1956), Canadian composer and teacher